United States v. Gouveia, 467 U.S. 180 (1984), was a case in which the United States Supreme Court held that prisoners in administrative segregation pending the investigation of crimes committed within the prison had no Sixth Amendment entitlement to counsel prior to the initiation of adversary judicial proceedings against them. In an opinion written by Justice William Rehnquist, the Court stated that the right to counsel may extend to "'critical' pretrial proceedings" that are adversarial in nature, but the Sixth Amendment right to counsel "attaches at the initiation of adversary judicial criminal proceedings".

See also
 List of United States Supreme Court cases
 Lists of United States Supreme Court cases by volume
 List of United States Supreme Court cases, volume 467
 List of United States Supreme Court cases by the Roberts Court

References

External links

United States Supreme Court cases
1984 in United States case law
United States Sixth Amendment appointment of counsel case law
United States Supreme Court cases of the Burger Court